2-Fluoroamphetamine (2-FA) is a stimulant drug from the amphetamine family which has been sold as a designer drug. 2-Fluoroamphetamine differs from 3- and 4-fluoroamphetamine in the position of the fluorine atom on the aromatic ring, making them positional isomers of one another. The replacement of a hydrogen atom with a fluorine atom in certain compounds to facilitate passage through the blood–brain barrier, as is desirable in central nervous system pharmaceutical agents, is a common practice due to the corresponding increase in lipophilicity granted by this substitution.

Pharmacology
Anorexiant dose (amount inhibiting food intake by 50% for 2 hours, given 1 hour earlier) = 15 mg/kg (rat; p.o.).

Analgesic dose (50% inhibition of response to tail-clamp) = 20 mg/kg (mouse; i.p.).

Effect on blood pressure: 0.5 mg/kg (rat; i.v.) produces an increase in BP of 29 mm.

Toxicology
LD50 (mouse; i.p.) = 100 mg/kg.

Legal Status

United States
The Federal Analogue Act, 21 U.S.C. § 813, is a section of the United States Controlled Substances Act, allowing any chemical "substantially similar" to an illegal drug (in Schedule I or II) to be treated as if it were also in Schedule I or II, but only if it is intended (ref 1) for human consumption. 2-FA may be considered to be an analog of amphetamine, thus falling under the Federal Analog Act.

China
As of October 2015 2-FA is a controlled substance in China.

See also 
 2-Fluoromethamphetamine
 2-Methylamphetamine (2-MA)
 2-Methoxymethamphetamine (methoxyphenamine)

References 

Substituted amphetamines
Fluoroarenes
Designer drugs
Norepinephrine-dopamine releasing agents